Sergeyeva is a rural locality (a village) in Beloyevskoye Rural Settlement, Kudymkarsky District, Perm Krai, Russia. The population was 12 as of 2010.

Geography 
Sergeyeva is located 34 km northwest of Kudymkar (the district's administrative centre) by road. Alexandrova is the nearest rural locality.

References 

Rural localities in Kudymkarsky District